Manjoo is a surname. Notable people with the surname include:

 Farhad Manjoo (born 1978), South Africa-born American journalist and writer
 Rashida Manjoo, South African United Nations official